The Perote mouse (Peromyscus bullatus), or Perote deer mouse, is a species of rodent in the family Cricetidae. It is found only in Mexico.

Description
The mouse is tawny-ochre in colour, with creamy white underparts. The middle of the back is duskier than the rest of the animal, and the sides of head are grey. However, it can only be clearly distinguished from other mice in the genus Peromyscus by the fact that its ears are larger than its hindfeet by at least , and, in the skeleton, by inflated auditory bullae. These features may be related to an enhanced sense of hearing, allowing the mouse to readily detect predators.

Distribution
The Perote mouse is found only in the Oriental Basin region of Mexico, including parts of western Veracruz, central Puebla and extreme eastern Tlaxcala. It is dominated by grassland and arid scrub vegetation, with some patches of coniferous forest. Within the region, the mouse prefers areas with sandy soil and a few juniper or yucca trees. The mouse's highly specific habitat requirements, limited distribution, and declining population all contribute to its critically endangered status.

References

Peromyscus
Endemic mammals of Mexico
Tehuacán Valley matorral
Rodents of North America
Natural history of Puebla
Natural history of Tlaxcala
Natural history of Veracruz
Mammals described in 1904
Critically endangered biota of Mexico
Critically endangered fauna of North America
Taxonomy articles created by Polbot
Oriental Basin